Adaxa Suite is a fully integrated Open Source Enterprise Resource Planning (ERP) Suite.

Business Model
Adaxa Suite is a General Public License GPL/GPL2 license and code are contributed back to the Open Source Community.

Integration

The core of the Adaxa Suite are iDempiere or ADempiere (for the old, maintained version), an Open Source ERP & CRM tool that handles core business processes:

Financials - General Ledger, receivables and payables, multi-company, multi-currency, bank reconciliation, complex banking, financial reporting
Sales - Quotes, Order entry, sales reporting, purchase orders, vendor reporting
CRM - Contact management, sales pipeline, campaign management
Inventory - multiple facilities, multiple locations, customizable rules engine, shipment consolidation
Manufacturing - MRP, scheduling, infinite BOM, demand management, production control, job costing
Asset Management - Tracking, barcoding, fixed asset register, depreciation
Reporting - built-in reporting tools, customized and standard reports, exportable reports

OpenLDAP provides a central login system that manages user logins for the entire enterprise.

Drupal is the platform for the Adaxa [eCommerce] web solution and is fully integrated with the complete Adaxa Suite.

Asterisk PBX manages all inbound calls (VOIP or trunk lines).

PostgreSQL database provides central data storage and maintenance of data and data protection through data replication and complex Failover capabilities in local and hosted environments.

Architecture
The system is based on a J2EE architecture. It is written in Java, and Postgres as the default database. Oracle is also supported by special requests. The GUI is ZKwebUI. Adaxa Suite runs on Linux and supports intelligent phone and tablet browsing.

Industries
Textile
Government
Scientific Instrument
Retail
Law
Banking (Peer to Peer)
Agricultural Chemicals Manufacture

The following business areas are addressed by the Adaxa Suite Application:

Enterprise Resource Planning (ERP)
Supply Chain Management (SCM)
Customer Relationship Management (CRM)
Financial Performance Analysis
Integrated Point of Sale (POS)
Integrated web store
Asset Management
Material Requirements Planning (MRP)

See also

 iDempiere
 ADempiere
Asterisk PBX

References 

Finalists in NZ Open Source Awards 

Open Source ERP, Redhuan D Oon, Pearson Education, January 1, 2010, 

ADempiere 3.4 ERP Solutions, Bayu Cahya Pamungkas, Packt Publishing, December 16, 2009,

External links 
 

Free ERP software